Port Alfred Airport  is an airport in the seaside town of Port Alfred, located in the Eastern Cape province on the southern coast of South Africa.

Facilities

References

External links
 
 

Airports in South Africa
Transport in the Eastern Cape
Buildings and structures in the Eastern Cape
Sarah Baartman District Municipality